A List of universities, colleges and schools in Casablanca:

Public Colleges and universities
 Académie internationale Mohammed VI de l'aviation civile (AIAC)
 École Hassania des Travaux Publics (EHTP)
 EMLYON Business School
 École Nationale Supérieure d'Electricité et de Mécanique (ENSEM)
 École supérieure de technologie de Casablanca (EST)
École nationale des pilotes de ligne (ENPL)
École supérieure des industries du textile et de l'habillement (ESITH)
École nationale de commerce et de gestion de Casablanca (ENCGC)
École supérieure des beaux-arts de Casablanca (ESBAC)
École royale navale (ERN)
Institut supérieur d'études maritimes (ISEM)
Institut supérieur de commerce et d'administration des entreprises (ISCAE)
 Toulouse Business School
 University of Hassan II - Ain Chock
 University of Hassan II - Mohammedia

Private high schools and colleges
 American Academy Casablanca (AAC)
 Casablanca American School
 George Washington Academy (GWA)
 Lycée Lyautey
 Nelson C. Brown High School
Lycée Louis Massignon

Buildings and structures in Casablanca